Tsatsiki – vänner för alltid ("Tsatsiki – Friends Forever") is an internationally co-produced drama film directed by Eddie Thomas Petersen, which was released to cinemas in Sweden on 25 December 2001, based on the books about Tsatsiki written by Moni Nilsson-Brännström.

Plot
Tsatsiki's girlfriend Maria suddenly brakes their relationship; she "doesn't believe something about love", and hates Tsatsiki's flowers because "krukväxter ger man bara till gamlingar" ("houseplants you should only give to old people").

A few days later his best friend Per Hammar also leaves Tsatsiki, because Tsatsiki made him unlucky with saying to Maria that "han kissar i sängen" ("bedwetting").

Later Tsatsiki, "Morsan" and Göran will travel to Greece where Tsatsiki's father, grandfather and cousin Elena live. A few days before the journey he goes to Maria who lost her pen box at school, and tells her that Göran and Niclas said that the flowers were a "love gesture", but she doesn't believe it and says that he can "go to Greece and after that tell her what love is if he can learn about love there". But when they're going it comes problems; Niclas says that he, "Morsan" and their rock group will go for a concert tour to Japan, but soon Tsatsiki allows "Morsan" to go and instead he lets Grandpa ("Morfar") go with him to Greece, where Tsatsiki's  paternal grandfather who is terminally ill ("Farfar") and Elena tells him what love is. Before his paternal grandfather dies he shows Tsatsiki and grandfather the place where he first met Tsatsiki's grandmother who was a member of the greek resistance like him during World War II they fought for the freedom of Greece against the germans.

When he comes back home, he goes to Per and apologizes and they go, together with Göran, to Strömmen where it's a fishing competition which Tsatsiki and Per planned before Tsatsiki made him unlucky. Later he goes to Maria and tells her that he learnt about love in Greece and she loves him again. Now he understands that the most alone person on the whole Earth is he/she who doesn't have any friend.

Citation
(Tsatsiki) Morfar, vet du vad jag tycker är viktigast? – Att ha en kompis. ("Grandpa, do you know what I think is most important? – To have a friend.")

About the film
Every actor from the earlier film Tsatsiki, morsan och polisen appeared in this new Tsatsiki-film except Alexandra Rapaport (changed to Sara Sommerfeld), Jacob Ericksson (changed to Eric Ericson) and Jonas Karlsson (changed to Joakim Nätterqvist). There are also new characters; Tsatsiki's grandfather (Yanis' father) (Georgios Moulianitakis), Tsatsiki's grandfather ("Morsan"'s father) (Krister Henriksson) and Tsatsiki's cousin Elena (Simona Ericsson).

In this film Tsatsiki and "Morsan" have left the villa area and live in an apartment in the city and Tsatsiki and his class have changed school.

Cast
Samuel Haus as Tsatsiki
Sara Sommerfeld as "Morsan"
Krister Henriksson as Tsatsiki's grandfather (Morsan's father)
Eric Ericson as Göran
Joakim Nätterqvist as Niclas (bassist)
Minken Fosheim as Tsatsiki's teacher
Sam Kessel as Per Hammar
Isa Engström as Maria
Maria Hazell as Sara
Kasper Lindström as Wille
Elin Åkesson as Elin
Amanda Rasmusson as Mona
Torbjörn Lindström as Maria's father
Marie Delleskog as Maria's mother
George Nakas as Yanis, Tsatsiki's father
Georgios Moulianitakis as Tsatsiki's grandfather (Yanis' father)
Thomas Hedengran as Lifeguard
Ida Holmberg as Retzina, Tsatsiki's sister (is born in the end on the film)

References

External links
 
 
 Tsatsiki – vänner för alltid 

Swedish drama films
2001 films
Danish drama films
Norwegian drama films
Films set in Greece
Swedish sequel films
2001 drama films
Danish sequel films
2000s Swedish films
2000s Swedish-language films